Charles Ryan may refer to:

 Sir Charles Lister Ryan (1831–1920), English civil servant
 Sir Charles Ryan (surgeon) (1853–1926), Australian surgeon and army officer
 Charles Ryan (mayor) (1927–2021), American politician and mayor of Springfield, Massachusetts
 Charles Ryan (game designer), American game designer of role-playing games